Institute of Pharmacology of the Polish Academy of Sciences is a scientific Institute of the Polish Academy of Sciences, based in Kraków.

Established in 1954 as the Department of Pharmacology of the Polish Academy of Sciences, it was transformed into an independent institute in 1974. The main research subject of the institute is neuropsychopharmacology, and it conducts doctoral studies in this specialty. It has its own botanical garden.

The first manager of the Department of Pharmacology of the Polish Academy of Sciences was Janusz Supniewski.

The Institute publishes a scientific journal Pharmacological Reports in English.

Directors 
 Janusz Supniewski (1954–1964)
 Józef Hano (1964–1977)
 Jerzy Maj (1977–1993)
 Edmund Przegaliński (1993–2006)
 Krzysztof Wędzony (2007–2016)
 Władysław Lasoń (from 2017)

Notable researchers 
 Jerzy Vetulani
 Ryszard Przewłocki
 Irena Nalepa
 Jacek Spławiński
 Marek Sanak
 Piotr Popik

External links 
 

Institutes of the Polish Academy of Sciences